Lango (also called Leb-Lango) is not exclusively a Luo language although past linguists have wrongly grouped it under Luo languages. It is a mixture of Ateker languages, and broken Luo dialects. The word "Lango" is used to describe both the language spoken by the indigenous and the tribe itself. 

It is mainly spoken in Lango sub-region, in the North Central Region of Uganda, by approximately 1.5 million speakers. An orthography for it using the Latin script has been introduced and is taught in primary schools.

The origin of Lango people is strongly linked to Karamojong and Teso speaking people.

Writing system  

Long vowels are indicated by doubling the vowel: .

References

External links

Languages of Uganda

Okoth Okombo, D. (1997). A Functional Grammar of Dholuo. Köln: Rüdiger Köppe Verlag.